Hans Jørgen Undelstvedt is the lead singer of the Norwegian rock band Heroes & Zeros. He also plays guitars and samples. In addition, he writes the lyrics for his band.

See also
 Heroes & Zeros
 Lars Løberg Tofte
 Arne Kjelsrud Mathisen

References

Norwegian rock guitarists
Norwegian rock singers
Living people
Musicians from Lillesand
Year of birth missing (living people)